Long Lake is a lake in Alberta.

Athabasca County
Long Lake